Muravey (English - Ant), is a three-wheeled (3 × 2) cargo scooter. There were several models based on passenger scooters produced by Tulamashzavod from 1959-1995.

Since 2020, Tulamashzavod has been producing a four-wheeled electric pallet truck with a cab named the Muravey VTS.

Models
In the first years of production, the cargo family had 2 modifications: TV-200K with an onboard platform, a load capacity of 200 kg and TV-200F with a van body. In 1962, production of the TV-200I with an isothermal body for the transportation of perishable goods began. TV-200 did not have the name "Muravey" yet.

 TG200 (T-200 «Tula», "Muravey")
 TGA200 (T-200M)
 TGA200-01 ("Tourist")
 TGA200-01P
 «Muravey-2 01» («Tulitsa»)
 «Muravey-2 02» («Tulitsa-2»)
 «Muravey-2 03»
 GTS-1

References

Motor scooters
Motorcycles introduced in 1959
Tulamashzavod
Tricycles